The 2017–18 season was FK Vardar's 26th consecutive season in the First League. This article shows player statistics and all official matches that the club will play during the 2017–18 season.

Squad

Left club during season

Competitions

First League

League table

Results summary

Results by round

Matches

Macedonian Cup

First round

Second round

Quarter-finals

UEFA Champions League

Second qualifying round

Third qualifying round

UEFA Europa League

Play-off round

Group stage

Statistics

Top scorers

Notes

References

FK Vardar seasons
Vardar
Vardar
Vardar